This is a list of people who served as Lord Lieutenant of Sussex. From 1677 until 1974, all Lord Lieutenants were also Custos Rotulorum of Sussex.

Lord Lieutenants of Sussex to 1974
Henry FitzAlan, 19th Earl of Arundel 1551–? jointly with
Thomas West, 9th Baron De La Warr 1551–?
Henry FitzAlan, 19th Earl of Arundel 1559–1561
John Lumley, 1st Baron Lumley 1561–1569
Anthony Browne, 1st Viscount Montagu 1570–1585 jointly with
William West, 1st Baron De La Warr 1570 – 1585 and
Thomas Sackville, 1st Baron Buckhurst 1570 – 1585
Charles Howard, 1st Earl of Nottingham 3 July 1585 – 26 August 1608 jointly with
Thomas Sackville, 1st Earl of Dorset 1586 – 19 April 1608 and
Henry Percy, 3rd Earl of Northumberland 1586 – 26 August 1608
Robert Sackville, 2nd Earl of Dorset 26 August 1608 – 27 February 1609
vacant
Richard Sackville, 3rd Earl of Dorset 10 December 1612 – 28 March 1624
Edward Sackville, 4th Earl of Dorset 13 July 1624 – 1642 jointly with
Algernon Percy, 10th Earl of Northumberland 16 September 1635 – 1642 and
Lord Maltravers 2 June 1636 – 1642
English Interregnum
Algernon Percy, 10th Earl of Northumberland 11 August 1660 – 13 October 1668
Joceline Percy, 11th Earl of Northumberland 9 November 1668 – 31 May 1670
Richard Sackville, 5th Earl of Dorset 15 July 1670 – 27 August 1677 jointly with
Charles Sackville, 6th Earl of Dorset 15 July 1670 – 28 February 1688
Francis Browne, 4th Viscount Montagu 28 February 1688 – 17 April 1689
Charles Sackville, 6th Earl of Dorset 17 April 1689 – 29 January 1706
Algernon Seymour, 7th Duke of Somerset 22 April 1706 – 7 February 1750
vacant
John Ashburnham, 2nd Earl of Ashburnham 18 March 1754 – 20 September 1757
George Nevill, 1st Earl of Abergavenny 20 September 1757 – 4 July 1761
Thomas Pelham-Holles, 1st Duke of Newcastle-upon-Tyne 4 July 1761 – 15 January 1763
Charles Wyndham, 2nd Earl of Egremont 15 January 1763 – 21 August 1763
Charles Lennox, 3rd Duke of Richmond 23 November 1763 – 29 December 1806
Charles Howard, 11th Duke of Norfolk 19 January 1807 – 16 December 1815
Charles Lennox, 4th Duke of Richmond 11 March 1816 – 28 August 1819
George Wyndham, 3rd Earl of Egremont 18 November 1819 – 19 June 1835
Charles Gordon-Lennox, 5th Duke of Richmond 19 June 1835 – 21 October 1860
Henry Pelham, 3rd Earl of Chichester 21 November 1860 – 16 March 1886
Henry Brand, 1st Viscount Hampden 6 April 1886 – 14 March 1892
William Nevill, 1st Marquess of Abergavenny 12 April 1892 – 19 December 1905
Henry Fitzalan-Howard, 15th Duke of Norfolk 19 December 1905 – 11 February 1917
Charles Wyndham, 3rd Baron Leconfield 26 March 1917 – 25 January 1949
Bernard Fitzalan-Howard, 16th Duke of Norfolk 25 January 1949 – 31 March 1974

At this point the Lieutenancy was split into two, per the Local Government Act 1972, and replaced by the Lord Lieutenant of East Sussex and the Lord Lieutenant of West Sussex.

References

External links
Lord Lieutenant of West Sussex

Sussex
History of Sussex
 
1974 disestablishments in England